National HealthCare Corporation is an American healthcare services provider. The company was founded in 1971 and is based in Murfreesboro, Tennessee. The services of the company include long-term diverse nursing and rehabilitative care to healthcare centers, facilities and hospitals in 11 states primarily in the southeastern United States. As of December, 2011, the number of the health care centers that are operated by the company reached 75 with a total of 9,456 licensed beds. As of December 2013, the company owns and operates 69 nursing facilities, 15 assisted living centers, 5 living centers with 38 homecare programs.

Background
The company offers its hospice services under the name of Caris Healthcare, which is the partially owned subsidiary of the company. NHC collaborated with Caris Healthcare to develop hospice services and deliver hospice services to over 1,000 patients in 28 locations every day. In 2013, the company completed the acquisition of six skilled health care centers from National Health Investors, Inc. The company has a market capitalization of $951.93 million with an enterprise value of $1.03 billion.

Operations 
In October 2013, the company renewed its one year $75 million line of credit with Bank of America, which is the sixth amendment to their credit agreement with Bank of America.

References

External links
 

Companies listed on  NYSE American
Health care companies established in 1971
1971 establishments in Tennessee
Health care companies based in Tennessee